is a train station on the Keihan Railway Uji Line in Uji, Kyoto Prefecture, Japan, and it is the terminal station on the Uji Line.

The station building, designed by architect Hiroyuki Wakabayashi, was awarded the Good Design Award in 1996.
In 2000, the station was selected as one of "Best 100 Stations in Kinki Region" by Kinki District Transport Bureau of the Ministry of Land, Infrastructure, Transport and Tourism.

Layout
The station has an island platform with two tracks on the ground.

Surroundings
Uji Bridge
Ujigami Shrine
Agata Shrine
The Tale of Genji Museum
Kōshōji
Byōdōin
Tsūen Tea
Uji Station (JR West)

Adjacent stations

References

External links
 Station information by Keihan Electric Railway

Railway stations in Kyoto Prefecture
Railway stations in Japan opened in 1913